Mirage Publishing was a publisher of true crime books, founded by Stephen Richards in 1998.

History
The first book to come off the press was about murdered Tyneside gangland figure Viv Graham, written by investigative author Stephen Richards.

Mirage was the first publisher to take a chance on publishing a book of poems, Birdman Opens His Mind by UK prisoner Charles Bronson. This was followed by Bronson's autobiography Silent Scream, which depicted the anachronistic penal system in the UK. Further books by Bronson and his then co-author and business manager Stephen Richards followed, including the book Solitary Fitness, detailing an individual training process with minimal resources and space.

Considered by The Times newspaper to be an "obscure publishing company from Tyneside", Mirage Publishing published the authorised biography of rock star Sting, A Sting in the Tale, which was written by long-time friend of Sting, James Berryman. The book became Night & Day magazine's book of the week, as well as being serialised in a UK tabloid.

Numerous books from Mirage Publishing have since been serialised by the UK press and magazines. The biggest accolade to be achieved by Mirage Publishing was to see its book Burnt,  by Scottish author Ian Colquhoun, being held aloft by Richard Madeley on Richard & Judy on UK TV.

Mirage, in a change of publishing genres, has moved away from true crime book publishing, citing the increase in violence for doing so. Mirage Publishing now solely concentrate on publishing mind, body and spirit, self-help, how-to guides and biographies.

References

External links
 Official website of Mirage Publishing

Book publishing companies of the United Kingdom